Queilén Airport (},  is an airport serving Queilén, a town in the Los Lagos Region of Chile. The town and airport are on a peninsula of Chiloé Island, sheltering an inlet off the Gulf of Corcovado.

See also

Transport in Chile
List of airports in Chile

References

External links
OpenStreetMap - Queilén
OurAirports - Queilén
SkyVector - Queilén

Airports in Chile
Airports in Chiloé Archipelago